Lord Charles Cavendish FRS (17 March 1704 – 28 April 1783) was a British nobleman and Whig politician.

Cavendish was the youngest son of William Cavendish, 2nd Duke of Devonshire, and Rachel Russell.

On 9 January 1727, Lord Charles Cavendish married Lady Anne de Grey (died 20 September 1733), daughter of Henry Grey, 1st Duke of Kent, and Jemima, his first wife. They had two children: Henry Cavendish (1731–1810), considered one of the most accomplished physicists and chemists of his era, and Frederick Cavendish (1733–1812).

Cavendish entered the House of Commons for Heytesbury in 1725 and would remain a member in various seats until 1741, when he turned the "family seat" of Derbyshire over to his nephew William Cavendish, Marquess of Hartington.

Scientific research

In 1757 the Royal Society (of which he was vice-president) awarded him the Copley Medal for his work in the development of thermometers which recorded the maximum and minimum temperatures they had reached.

Charles Cavendish was also one of the early experimenters with the electrical storage device, the Leyden jar, which came to England in 1746.  His interest in electrical research was passed on to his son Henry who was also a prominent member of the Royal Society.  Henry Cavendish was even better known than his father for electrical experiments, and also for other discoveries in physics, including the famous torsion-balance measurement of the mass of the earth.

One of Charles Cavendish's experiments with electricity appears to have been an attempt to replicate the plasma glow seen during the early Francis Hauksbee experiment with a semi-vacuum in the friction-generator's glass globe.  A recent thesis on plasma arcs mentions Priestley's account of a replication of this by the experimenter Benjamin Wilson (1721–1788):

References 
 familysearch.org Accessed 4 November 2007
  Tracking Down the Origin of Arc Plasma Science. by André Anders

External links

1704 births
1783 deaths
Whig (British political party) MPs for English constituencies
Members of the Parliament of Great Britain for constituencies in Wiltshire
Younger sons of dukes
Fellows of the Royal Society
Recipients of the Copley Medal
Charles Cavendish, Lord
18th-century British people
Place of birth missing
Place of death missing
Members of the Parliament of Great Britain for constituencies in Derbyshire